Vivarium is the debut album by the Scottish alternative rock band Twin Atlantic.

Music videos for "What Is Light? Where Is Laughter?" and "Lightspeed" were filmed during their American tour and have since been uploaded through their MySpace and PureVolume pages.

Track listing

Personnel

 Sam McTrusty - rhythm guitar, lead vocals
 Barry McKenna - lead guitar, cello, backing vocals
 Ross McNae - bass guitar, piano, backing vocals
 Craig Kneale - drums, percussion, backing vocals

References

External links
Official Website
MySpace Website

2009 debut albums
Twin Atlantic albums
Red Bull Records albums